Fabien Cool (born 29 August 1972, in L'Isle-Adam) is a French former professional football goalkeeper.

Except for a loan spell at Gueugnon in the 1993–94 season, Cool played for Auxerre his whole career, helping them to win the national championship in 1996 and the domestic cup in 1996, 2003 and 2005.

Initially backing up French international Lionel Charbonnier, he was the club's undisputed starter from 1998–2006, losing that status in his final year. Cool announced his retirement from professional football on 19 May 2007.

Honours
Auxerre
Division 1 (1): 1995-96
Coupe de France (2): 2003, 2005

External links

1972 births
Living people
People from L'Isle-Adam, Val-d'Oise
French footballers
Association football goalkeepers
Ligue 1 players
Ligue 2 players
AJ Auxerre players
FC Gueugnon players
Footballers from Val-d'Oise